The New Zealand Pony Clubs Association (NZPCA) consists of 82 clubs encompassing 250 branches that work together to promote and improve the quality of riding and horse management instruction for riders and their coaches throughout New Zealand. The NZPCA has 8,800 members, which makes it one of the largest youth sporting organizations in the country.

With almost all clubs having branches, rallies are usually held at the branch level, leaving clubs to organize other activities, such as certificates and inter-branch competitions.

The eighty-two clubs are divided into sixteen areas, twelve in the North Island and four in the South Island. Each area is entitled to have one representative on the NZPCA committee of management, and send one team of up to six riders to both the NZPCA Horse Trials Teams Championships and the NZPCA Teams Dressage Championships.

National Championships are held annually for horse trials and dressage. Showjumping and mounted games currently have separate North and South Island Championships. There are also North Island and South Island Horse Trials Teams Competitions; the South Island competition is called Springston Trophy and the North Island competition is named Timberlands after the club that hosts it.

History
The formation of the New Zealand Pony Clubs Association began in 1944, when Dorothy Campbell read about the British Horse Society and Pony Club in the magazine Riding, which inspired her to write to the secretary of the organisation.

At that time, many children in New Zealand were growing up on farms and most had ponies and often rode them to get to school. There was no television and not as many other sports activities available as there are now. So these children spent a lot of time with their ponies, but there was often no instruction available to teach them to ride safely or to care for their ponies properly.

Dorothy Campbell thought that both children and ponies would benefit from some organised activities and she arranged to hold a first fund raising gymkhana in Hawkes Bay. She was amazed by the number of riders who attended.

As a result of this enthusiasm, Dorothy established the Heretaunga Pony Club, which became affiliated to the British organisation. Over the next two years, quite a number of other pony clubs were formed, and a meeting was called in Palmerston North on 15 October 1946, at which the NZPCA was formed.

From this beginning, the NZPCA has grown to encompass 16 areas with 82 clubs and 250 branches throughout New Zealand.

See also
Pony Club
Pony Club Australia
The Pony Club
United States Pony Clubs

References

External links
nzpca.org
springston-trophy.org

Equestrian organizations